Bothriochloa compressa is a species of grass belonging to genus Bothriochloa. It is found in India.

References

compressa